The enzyme inulin fructotransferase (DFA-I-forming) catalyzes the following process:

Produces α-D-fructofuranose β-D-fructofuranose 1,2′:2,1′-dianhydride (DFA I) by successively eliminating the diminishing (2→1)-β-D-fructan (inulin) chain from the terminal D-fructosyl-D-fructosyl disaccharide.

This enzyme belongs to the family of lyases, specifically those carbon-oxygen lyases acting on polysaccharides.  The systematic name of this enzyme class is (2→1)-β-D-fructan lyase (α-Dfructofuranose-β-D-fructofuranose-1,2′:2,1′-dianhydride-forming). Other names in common use include inulin fructotransferase (DFA-I-producing), inulin fructotransferase (depolymerizing,, difructofuranose-1,2':2',1-dianhydride-forming), inulin D-fructosyl-D-fructosyltransferase, (1,2':1',2-dianhydride-forming), inulin D-fructosyl-D-fructosyltransferase (forming, and α-D-fructofuranose β-D-fructofuranose 1,2':1',2-dianhydride).

References

 

EC 4.2.2
Enzymes of unknown structure